Sayadov is an Azerbaijani masculine surname, its feminine counterpart is Sayadova. Notable people with the surname include:

Armais Sayadov (born 1937), Azerbaijani wrestler
Georgy Sayadov (born 1931), Azerbaijani wrestler

Azerbaijani-language surnames